Akalovo is a village in Imo state, southeastern Nigeria. It is located near the city of Owerri.

Populated places in Imo State